Sherry Frost is a New Hampshire politician.

Career
On November 8, 2016, Frost was elected to the New Hampshire House of Representatives where she represents the Strafford 16 district. Frost assumed office in 2016. Frost is a Democrat. Frost endorsed Bernie Sanders in the 2020 Democratic Party presidential primaries.

Personal life
Frost resides in Dover, New Hampshire.

References

Living people
Women state legislators in New Hampshire
People from Dover, New Hampshire
Democratic Party members of the New Hampshire House of Representatives
21st-century American women politicians
21st-century American politicians
Year of birth missing (living people)